Tracey Marie Leone (born May 5, 1967) is a retired American soccer midfielder who was a member of the United States women's national soccer team.  She was the first American to win a world championship as both a player and as a head coach.

International career statistics

Personal life
Leone is married to Ray Leone.  The pair are both women's college soccer coaches.  As of 2014, they are the only two coaches in Division 1 college soccer who are married. The pair have coached together at Creighton, Clemson, Arizona State, and Harvard.

References

External links

Northeastern coaching profile
Arizona State coaching profile

Living people
1967 births
North Carolina Tar Heels women's soccer players
1991 FIFA Women's World Cup players
American women's soccer players
United States women's international soccer players
FIFA Women's World Cup-winning players
Women's association football midfielders
Clemson Tigers women's soccer coaches
Northeastern Huskies women's soccer coaches
American soccer coaches